is a Japanese film director from Miyagi Prefecture, mainly focusing on violent sex and gore films.

Biography
He has a small following outside Japan thanks to a couple of notorious films:Entrails of a Beauty and Entrails of a Virgin. This type of film (low budget, yet high production values and shot on video), helped usher in a new era of extreme Asia movies.  Komizu was the creator of the Japanese cult zombie film Battle Girl: The Living Dead in Tokyo Bay which was screened in 1991.

His nickname, "Gaira", apparently comes from a Japanese monster in the film  (1966).

Filmography 
 Seiyugi (1968)
 Go, Go Second Time Virgin (1969) (writing)
 Seizoku (1970)
 Sailor-fuku shikijo shiiku (1982)
 Hako no naka no onna: shojo ikenie (1985)
 Bijo no harawata (1986)
 Shojo no harawata (1986)
 Ryôjoku mesu ichiba – kankin (1986)
 Guzoo The Thing Forsaken By God Part I  (1986)
 Gômon kifujin (1987)
 Hoshi tsugu mono (1990)
 Batoru garu (1992)
 XX: utsukushiki kyôki (1993)
 Gokudo no ane Reiko (1995)

References

External links

Bibliography
 Hamamoto, Maki. "Entrails of Kazuo Komizu" (interview), in Asian Cult Cinema, #45.

1946 births
Japanese film directors
Living people